The 2005 Macau Grand Prix (formally the 52nd Macau Grand Prix) was a motor race for Formula Three cars that was held on the streets of Macau on 20 November 2005. Unlike other races, such as the Masters of Formula 3, the 2005 Macau Grand Prix was not a part of any Formula Three championship, but was open to entries from all Formula Three championships. The race itself was made up of two races: a ten-lap qualifying race that decided the starting grid for the fifteen-lap main race. The 2005 race was the 52nd running of the Macau Grand Prix and the 23rd for Formula Three cars.

The Grand Prix was won by Manor Motorsport driver Lucas di Grassi, having finished third in the previous day's qualification race which was won by Loïc Duval of ASM Formule 3. Di Grassi took the lead after Duval was penalised for a jump start and maintained it until Robert Kubica of Carlin Motorsport passed him on lap ten. After three laps behind the safety car for a three-car pileup at Faraway Hill corner, di Grassi reclaimed the lead from Kubica at the start of lap 14 and held it for the rest of the race to claim the first victory for a Brazilian driver in Macau since Maurício Gugelmin in the 1985 edition. Second place went to Kubica while third was the highest-placed rookie Sebastian Vettel of ASM Formule 3.

Background and entry list
The Macau Grand Prix is a Formula Three race considered to be a stepping stone to higher motor racing categories such as Formula One and has been termed the territory's most prestigious international sporting event. The 2005 Macau Grand Prix was the 52nd running of the event and the 23rd time the race was held to Formula Three regulations. It took place on the  22-turn Guia Circuit on 21 November 2005 with three preceding days of practice and qualifying.

In order to compete in Macau, drivers had to race in a Fédération Internationale de l'Automobile (FIA)-regulated championship meeting during the calendar year, in either the FIA Formula 3 International Trophy or one of the domestic championships, with the highest-placed drivers given priority in receiving an invitation to the event. Within the 30 car grid of the event, just one of the three major Formula Three championships was represented by its series champion. João Paulo de Oliveira, from the Japanese series, was the sole champion taking part, as the Euro Formula Three Series winner and early pre-race favourite Lewis Hamilton was advised by McLaren to miss the race and concentrate on planning for 2006. Furthermore, the champion of the British Formula Three International Series Álvaro Parente had an A1GP commitment in Malaysia. Thus the highest placed participants from the Euro and British series' were Lucas di Grassi and Charlie Kimball respectively. The sole driver from outside of Formula Three to race in Macau was Robert Kubica, the Formula Renault 3.5 Series champion. Five Macanese drivers received invitations from race organisers to take part in the race. They were Rodolfo Ávila, Michael Ho, Jo Merszei, Lou Meng Cheong and Lei Kit Meng.

Practice and qualifying
A total of two half an hour practice sessions preceded the race on Sunday: one on Thursday morning and one on Friday morning. Paolo Montin for Ombra Racing had minor problems with his brakes but lapped fastest with a minute left at 2 minutes, 14.192 seconds. Di Grassi of Manor Motorsport was 0.210 seconds behind in second. Sebastian Vettel, Kazuki Nakajima, Loïc Duval, Kubica, de Oliveira, Franck Perera, Naoki Yokomizo and Fábio Carbone were in positions three to ten. Most drivers avoided an incident except for Dan Clarke, who was stranded at the Melco hairpin and Cheong removed one of his car's wheels in a collision against a trackside wall.

Qualifying was divided into two 45-minute sessions; the first was held on Thursday afternoon, and the second on Friday afternoon. The fastest time set by each driver from either session counted towards his final starting position for the qualification race. The first qualifying session was delayed by 20 minutes due to an incident during practice for the Porsche Carrera Cup Asia race when driver Jonny Cocker crashed and created a large dent in a barrier beside the track. When it did start, Duval, who moved from Signature Team to fill in for Hamilton at Macau, was the early pace setter but Kubica resolved a loose seat and car set-up problems to steadily move up the order and top the time sheets with qualifying's final lap at 2 minutes, 12.754 seconds. Di Grassi had pole position for ten minutes until Kubica demoted him to second. Duval was close behind in third. Carbone set a late lap that put him provisional fourth. Yokomizo moved up the order to claim fifth and Watts finished in sixth. De Oliviera challenged Duval early on but took seventh, Conway was the highest-placed rookie in eighth, Kohei Hirate came ninth and Perera rounded out the top ten. Nakajima was the fastest man not to get into the top ten but he was in front of Vettel. They were followed by Romain Grosjean and Montin on the provisional seventh row. Christian Bakkerud was next up ahead of Guillaume Moreau, Bruno Senna, Daisuke Ikeda, Kimball and Karl Reindler. The rest of the provisional line up consisted of Taku Bamba, Clarke, Filip Salaquarda, Ávila, Ho, Stephen Jelley, Lei, Merszei, Cheong and Steven Kane who only set one timed lap due to an oil leak. Qualifying was twice interrupted with yellow flags as Cheong went into the wall at San Francisco Bend turn and Nakajima removed his front suspension at Moorish Hill corner.

For missing the red light signal instructing him to enter the weighbridge, Perera was ordered to meet the stewards after qualifying and all of his lap times were deleted. In the second half-hour practice session, de Oliviera traded the top spot with several drivers until he came out on top with a time of 2 minutes, 12.708 seconds with 16 minutes left. Conway continued to progress in the time sheets with the second-fastest lap and was a little more than four-hundredths of a second slower than de Oliviera. Duval, Kubica, Perera, di Grassi, Yokomizo, Clarke, Kimball and Montin were in positions four to ten. Officials red flagged the session with five minutes left due to two concurrent accidents. Bakkerud spun backwards into the Dona Maria Bend corner tyre wall and Senna clouted a barrier with his car's right-hand corner on his way down the hill leaving Teddy Yip Bend corner and removed both his wheels. Kane ended the session early with a collision against the Moorish Hill barrier.

The second qualifying session was stopped early on when Carbone entered the start/finish line straight too fast, glanced a barrier at the exit of the Reservoir Bend corner, and was stranded in the centre of the track. Almost immediately after the restart, a second red flag was prompted by a multi-car collision between Clarke, Salaquarda and Moreau at Police Bend turn and a third was triggered by Kimball whose spin at the same corner made the track impassable. The last stoppage came when de Oliviera crashed into an wall. Kubica held pole position early on until Duval took it with a new unofficial lap record of 2 minutes, 11.348 seconds with eleven minutes left and maintained it until the end of qualifying. A lack of a slipstream on the main straight hindered Di Grassi, who took second with a last-minute lap. Kubica bettered his lap but fell to third and Conway moved up four places to fourth despite a crash into the Police Bend barrier soon after. Perera took fifth and was provisionally joined on the grid's third row by Montin who gained eight positions from previous day's effort. De Oliviera maintained seventh, Nakajima moved to eighth and his teammate Carbone and Moreau completed the top ten qualifiers. Behind them the rest of the field lined up as Yokomizo, Vettel, Kimball, Watts, Bakkerud, Hirate,  Reindler, Bamba, Clarke, Grosjean, Jelley, Senna, Ikeda, Kane, Ávila, Salaquarda, Ho, Cheong, Lei and Merszei. After the session, di Grassi, Perera and Reindler had their fastest two qualifying lap times invalidated after the stewards deemed the trio to have not slowed sufficiently under yellow flag conditions for de Oliviera's crash.

Qualifying classification
Each of the driver's fastest lap times from the two qualifying sessions are denoted in bold.

  – Franck Perera had his fastest two lap times from the first qualifying session invalidated for missing the weighbridge.
  – Lucas di Grassi, Franck Perera and Karl Reindler had their two best lap times in the second qualification session deleted for failing to slow under yellow flag conditions.

Warm-up one
A 20-minute warm-up session was held on the morning of the qualifying race. Perera continued to move up in the time sheets with the session's fastest lap of 2 minutes, 13.185 seconds. Montin set a lap time that was 0.308 seconds slower in second. Conway, Duval, Carbone, Yokomizo, Kubica, Vettel, de Oliviera and Hirate followed in positions three through ten.

Qualification race

The qualifying race to set the starting order for the main race started in dry and sunny weather at 13:40 Macau Standard Time (UTC+08:00) on 19 November. On a pre-race reconnaissance lap, Bamba came into Reservoir Bend corner too quick and ran into the rear of Cheong's car which had come to a stop in its grid slot. Both cars sustained damage to their suspensions and could not start the race. Furthermore, Cheong's vehicle was pushed forwards into an unnamed female and injured her. Duval made a poor start while Kubica was faster off the line to take the lead on the run to Mandarin Oriental Bend corner. However, Duval reclaimed first from Kubica going into Lisboa turn as the latter could not withstand his overtake and instead focused himself on avoiding risks and preserve his car for Sunday's race. Di Grassi out-dragged teammate Conway approaching Reservoir turn and attempted a pass on Kubica on the outside but he backed out of it. Carbone fell from ninth to nineteenth by the end of the first lap, while Watts gained five places entering Lisboa corner to eighth.

Duval pulled away from Kubica and led by two seconds at the end of lap two as Conway and di Grassi battled over third place and Montin duelled de Oliviera for fifth position. That lap, Senna stopped at Teddy Yip Bend turn with an engine failure and red and yellow striped flags were shown at that part of the track because of the possibility that oil had been laid there. Elsewhere down the order, Vettel got past Moreau and began to close up to Watts as the trio of Kimball, Yokomizo and Bakkerud duelled each other. Carbone lost control of his car at San Francisco Bend corner but avoided a collision with an barrier alongside the track. Vettel moved ahead of Watts and into eighth but kept the position for a few seconds as Watts retook it. Approaching the conclusion of lap four, di Grassi made an error that lost him momentum. Conway challenged di Grassi but the latter remained in third. Bakkerud overtook Yokomizo and then Kimball at Reservoir Bend corner but Kimball retook the position entering the straight linking the Mandarin Oriental Bend and Lisboa turns.

While most cars were fairly spread out at the front, it was not a major issue to get through traffic but Cheong heavily delayed Kubica at the Melco hairpin who had a poor-handling car due to one of his wheels buckled from the accident with Bamba. Kubica waited until he was on a wider part of the track before he lapped Cheong. In the race's final laps, more overtakes occurred as Montin was passed by de Oliviera while Vettel overtook Watts as Kimball and Bakkerud traded tenth twice. Watts blocked a pass from Kimball at Lisboa corner as Moreau overtook Bakkerud. Kimball then overtook Watts at Lisboa turn on the next lap. Cheong retired in the Lisboa turn escape road on the final lap. Kubica closed up to Duval but chose not to take risks and Duval slowed slightly to win the qualification race and pole position for the Grand Prix itself by 1.577 seconds. Di Grassi was third, Conway fourth and Montin fifth. De Oliviera, Nakajima, Vettel, Kimball and Watts completed the top ten. The final classified finishers were Bakkerud, Moreau, Clarke, Yokomizo, Perera, Grosjean, Reindler, Kane, Carbone, Ikeda, Jelley, Hirate, Salaquarda, Ávila, Ho, Merszei and Lei.

Qualification race classification

  – Taku Bamba was barred from competing in the Grand Prix for causing an incident with Lou Meng Cheong on the grid.

Warm-up two
After the qualifying race, but before second warm-up, Bamba was summoned to the stewards office to explain the incident with Cheong. The stewards decided to bar Bamba from the main race on Sunday for causing "an avoidable collision". The second 20-minute warm-up session took place on the morning of the main race. Di Grassi was quickest with a lap of 2 minutes, 11.953 seconds with Duval 0.973 seconds slower in second. Perera, Conway, Yokomizo, Vettel, Watts, Senna, Ikeda and Grosjean made up positions three through ten. Midway through the session, Moreau crashed heavily at Reservoir Bend corner, but his team rebuilt his car before the race.

Main race
The race was delayed from its 15:45 start time on 20 November due to multiple incidents in the Asian Formula Renault Challenge race and the 2005 Guia Race of Macau. When it did begin in dry and sunny weather, Duval moved slightly before the five red lights extinguished. He stopped on the front of the line marking his grid slot once he realised his error. This did not stop Duval from making a brisk start as Kubica made an equally fast getaway. Kubica drew alongside Duval on the approach to Lisboa corner but did not get through as the field passed without incident. Further down the order, Watts relinquished positions and Vettel overtook Montin for fourth. Conway ran into the rear of Montin and sustained a slow tyre puncture. In the meantime, Duval opened up a 2.2-second advantage upfront by the end of the first lap. The lap after, the stewards announced that Duval had been adjudged to have jumped the start as he continued to increase his advantage by one second per lap in order to strategically minimise his loss of position. On lap two, di Grassi turned left onto the outside going into Lisboa corner and overtook Kubica for second. Behind them, Senna and Hirate retired after the two made contact at the Melco hairpin and temporarily blocked the track.

Conway slowed on his way to the pit lane to have his punctured tyre replaced and he rejoined down the order. Perera advanced through the field and challenged Bakkerud for tenth but the latter held the place. Kimball was fending off the faster de Oliviera while di Grassi blocked Kubica's attempts to pass him. Two drivers retired during laps four and five: Salaquarda entered the pit lane with an unknown problem and Yokomizo missed the braking point for Lisboa corner and crashed into the wall. Just as officials were about to disqualify Duval by waving the black flag, he entered the pit lane at the start of lap six and his hope of becoming the fourth Frenchman in a row to win in Macau were over. Duval emerged in the centre of a pack of cars led by Watts in tenth and di Grassi now led with Kubica second as Clarke passed Kimball for seventh. Jelley lacked most of his front wing because he ran into the rear of Reindler's vehicle and delayed a small pack of cars. On the eighth lap, Kubica attempted to overtake di Grassi on the outside but lost control of his car and narrowly avoided taking himself out of contention.

Further round the lap, Kubica gently nudged di Grassi at the Melco hairpin and fell back to give himself more space before a second try. Overtakes occurred further down the field: Duval passed Watts and began to draw closer to Kimball after Watts chose not to duel Duval. Jelley's car gave way coming into Reservoir Bend corner and struck the barrier, which he slid against before stopping. Since Jelley was in a section of track that was not hazardous to others, the race was not interrupted and the traffic jam dispersed. As the leaders entered Mandarin Bend to start lap ten, a slower car impeded di Grassi and Kubica tucked into his slipstream. Kubica steered to the outside of di Grassi into Lisboa turn for the lead. Kubica immediately began to pull away as de Oliviera took fourth from Montin and Duval overtook Kimball and Clarke to advance to sixth. Clarke tried to follow Duval through the next sequence of turns but braked too late and hit the barrier at Faraway Hill corner. Kimball incorrectly guessed the direction Clarke was going and the two made contact. Watts collected them and slid into an wall before stopping several yards down the track.

Since cars were adjudged to be in a dangerous position and rescue workers were needed at Faraway Hill turn, the safety car was dispatched and Kubica's lead of 1.612 seconds was reduced to nothing and he lost his opportunity of taking a comfortable win. Under the safety car, Cheong drove into the pit lane to retire for unknown reasons while Carbone made a pit stop but lost no time to the leaders. The safety car was withdrawn at the start of lap 14 and racing resumed. Di Grassi noted an opportunity to overtake the leader Kubica going into Mandarin Bend corner and did so. That lap, Kane spun and he could not restart his car because of an overheating engine. On his second appearance in Macau, it was di Grassi's victory, achieving the first win for a Brazilian driver in Macau since Maurício Gugelmin won the 1985 race. Despite putting di Grassi under extensive pressure, Kubica could not get back at him and was 0.659 seconds behind in second, with Vettel completing the podium as the highest-placed rookie in third. Off the podium, de Oliviera took fourth, Nakajima came fifth and Duval sixth. Bakkerud took seventh from Montin at the line and Grosjean and Perera rounded out the top ten. Moreau, Carbone, Reindler and Conway filled positions 11 to 14. Ho moved up ten places from his starting position to come 15th and Ávila, Ikeda, Lei, Merszei and Kane were the final finishers.

Main Race classification

References

External links
 

Macau
Macau Grand Prix
Macau Grand Prix
Macau Grand Prix Formula Three